The Senate House State Historic Site is located on Fair Street in Kingston, New York, United States. During the Revolutionary War, New York's First Constitutional Convention met there and on April 20, 1777, adopted the first New York State Constitution. After one month, the Senate fled the British troops who were advancing from Manhattan. The Senate House and much of Kingston was burned in retribution. It has served as a museum from the late 19th century. Currently it is owned and operated by the New York State Office of Parks, Recreation and Historic Preservation.

In 1971 it was listed on the National Register of Historic Places, the first building in Kingston listed. At that time it was a contributing property to the small Clinton Avenue Historic District. Four years later, in 1975, the original district was replaced with the larger Kingston Stockade District, which retained the Senate House and all the other properties of the original district.

The house first belonged to Wessel Wesselse Ten Broeck, born about 1636, who emigrated to New Amsterdam from Wessen, in Westphalia in 1659. It is generally described as having been  built in 1676, but can be certainly dated to some time before his death in 1704. The ground floor of the house consists of three rooms, lined up along the street, with an entrance hallway between two of the rooms. As is typical of early Dutch houses in the Hudson Valley, the house is of stone, with the exception of the rear wall which is brick, laid in Flemish bond. At the back is a kitchen wing, added early, but somewhat later than the original construction.

See also

List of New York State Historic Sites
List of the oldest buildings in New York
National Register of Historic Places listings in Ulster County, New York

References

External links

Senate House State Historic Site at NYS Office of Parks, Recreation and Historic Preservation
National Park Service: Senate House in Kingston
Wildernet information about Senate House
Archeology at the Senate House
Rachel DuMont, A Brave Little Maid of the Revolution. A true story of the burning of Kingston; for girls and boys, and older people (1884)

National Register of Historic Places in Ulster County, New York
Historic American Buildings Survey in New York (state)
New York (state) historic sites
Museums in Ulster County, New York
Tourist attractions in Ulster County, New York
History museums in New York (state)
New York (state) in the American Revolution
American Revolutionary War sites
Houses completed in 1676
Kingston, New York
Individually listed contributing properties to historic districts on the National Register in New York (state)
Government buildings on the National Register of Historic Places in New York (state)
1676 establishments in the Province of New York